L. dentata may refer to:
 Lavandula dentata, the French lavender. a plant species native to Spain
 Ligularia dentata, the summer ragwort, a plant species
 Liophryne dentata, a frog species endemic to Papua New Guinea
 Litoria dentata, the bleating tree frog or Keferstein's tree frog, a tree frog species native to Australia

See also
 Dentata (disambiguation)